The Banco de Portugal (English: Bank of Portugal) is the central bank of the Portuguese Republic. The bank was founded by royal charter in 1846, during the reign of Queen Maria II of Portugal, by a merger of the Banco de Lisboa (Bank of Lisbon), the first bank founded in Portugal, and the Companhia Confiança Nacional (National Insurance Company), making it one of the oldest banks in continuous operation in the world. It is a full member of the Eurosystem and the European System of Central Banks. Until January 1999, when Portugal adopted the euro, the bank was responsible for the former Portuguese currency, the escudo.

History

Foundation
Queen Maria II of Portugal established the bank by royal charter on 19 November 1846 to act as a commercial bank and issuing bank, it came about as the result of a merger of the Banco de Lisboa, the first bank founded in Portugal, and the Companhia de Confiança Nacional, an investment company specialised in the financing of the public debt.

The bank was designated by the Portuguese Crown as the emitter of legal tender, at the time the Portuguese real, which it continued producing until 1911.

Republic

Following the Implementation of the Republic in 1910, the Banco de Portugal began to emit the Portuguese Escudo.

In 1932, the bank established the Biblioteca do Banco de Portugal, one of the most significant private libraries in Portugal.

In 1946, the institution was bestowed the honor of Grand Cross of the Order of Christ by the President of Portugal.

During the Estado Novo, the bank pursued a vigorous policy of gold acquisition starting in 1957, which has contributed towards Portugal's present-day status of having the 14th largest gold reserve in the world.

Nationalization

Following its nationalisation in September 1974 and its new Organic Law (1975), the Banco de Portugal was, for the first time, responsible for the supervision of the banking system.

It is an integral part of the European System of Central Banks, which was founded in June 1998.

The Banco de Portugal ceased emission of the Portuguese Escudo in 1999, with the country's adoption of the Euro.

Contemporary
In 2013, the bank announced that it would pay €359 million in dividends, referring to the year of 2012.

In 2014, the bank announced that it would pay €202 million in dividends, referring to the year of 2013, representing a steep decline in comparison to 2012.

In August 2014, Banco de Portugal announced it was restructuring Portugal's second biggest bank, Banco Espirito Santo, by splitting the bank in two.  During the bank restructure, one of the lenders, Oak Finance, had its loan liabilities remain with Banco Espirito Santo. This triggered a lawsuit from a group of investors including: hedge funds and the New Zealand Superannuation Fund.

Governors

Prior to 1887, the Banco de Portugal was governed by a chairman of the board. Since then, the administration has been entrusted to the governor of the Banco de Portugal.

See also

Economy of Portugal
Euro
Portuguese escudo, the former currency of Portugal
Alves dos Reis

References

External links
 Official website of Banco de Portugal
 Lista de Bancos em Portugal
 Banco Central Europeu

Portugal
Portugal
Economy of Portugal
Banks of Portugal
Banks established in 1846
1846 establishments in Portugal